Albert Edward Allum (15 October 1930 – 6 January 2018) was an English professional footballer who played in the Football League for Queens Park Rangers as an outside forward.

Career statistics

References

External links
 

English footballers
English Football League players
1950 births
Dover F.C. players
Queens Park Rangers F.C. players
People from Notting Hill
Southern Football League players
Association football outside forwards
Hereford United F.C. players
Brentford F.C. players
2018 deaths